Happy Land was an amusement park in Thailand. It was located in Khwaeng Khlong Chan, Bang Kapi District, Bangkok, on Nawamin Road (or Sukha Phiban 1 Road). It has been closed since 1977, and the area is now occupied by residential houses. Some of its rides were sold to Siam Park City.

References 

Defunct amusement parks in Thailand
Buildings and structures in Bangkok
Neighbourhoods of Bangkok